Ved Første Øjekast is the second studio album by Danish electronic musician Mike Sheridan, released in April 2012 through Playground Music Scandinavia. The album features vocals by Rasmus Walter, Freja Loeb and Dahl Kammerkor.

Track listing

References 

2012 albums